Zarya is a rural locality (a village) in Novoselskoye Rural Settlement, Kovrovsky District, Vladimir Oblast, Russia. The population was 1 as of 2010.

Geography 
Zarya is located 11 km south of Kovrov (the district's administrative centre) by road. Kovrov-Gruzovoy is the nearest rural locality.

References 

Rural localities in Kovrovsky District